Costin Ionuț Amzăr (born 11 July 2003) is a Romanian professional footballer who plays as a left back for Dinamo București.

Club career

Dinamo București

He made his Liga I debut for Dinamo București against CS Mioveni on 16 August 2021.

Style of play

Gabriel Răduță, the former head of Dinamo's Academy, said about Amzăr that he has similarities to Alphonso Davies due to his explosive pace remembering the period when he trained him: "He is a left back, but in juniors we put him in front as much as possible when we needed him, because he goes up and has a very good offensive contribution ”

Career statistics

Club

References

External links
 
 

2003 births
Living people
Romanian footballers
Association football defenders
FC Dinamo București players
Liga I players
Romania youth international footballers